The Blanchard Valley Conference is an Ohio High School Athletic Association affiliated athletic league located in Hancock, Putnam, and Wood Counties in northwest Ohio.  Its name derives from the Blanchard River, which runs through the area in which the schools are located. Findlay, which is part of the Three Rivers Athletic Conference, is the only high school in Hancock County that is a member of the Ohio High School Athletic Association that is not part of the BVC.

Current members

 Pandora-Gilboa is also a current member of the Putnam County League.
2.Charter Member
3.Need to check the league/conference name. P-G won conference title in another conference other than the BVC & NWC once.

Future member

Former Members

League history
The BVC's roots lie in the Hancock County League often known as the Little 9/8/7 League, which formed in 1922. Arcadia, Arlington, Liberty-Benton, McComb, Mount Blanchard, Mount Cory, Rawson, Van Buren, Vanlue were the founding members. Cory-Rawson was formed by the consolidation of Mount Cory and Rawson in 1950. The eight team lineup lasted for another decade, until Mount Blanchard (due to consolidate into Riverdale in 1962) joined the Hardin County League.

The remaining seven members decided to reorganize the league in 1965 and add other schools, giving birth to the BVC. Hardin Northern, Leipsic (football only), and Westwood signed on to make the conference a 9 member/10 football member conference.  When Westwood was absorbed by the Bowling Green City School District in 1966, Pandora-Gilboa replaced them in the league for the 1966-67 school year in football only. Leipsic and Pandora-Gilboa were both members of the Putnam County League for all non-football sports at this time.

Leipsic and Pandora-Gilboa were able to work out schedules with the PCL to be able to join the BVC in all sports, while keeping membership in both conferences, in 1971.

On April 19, 2012, Ada High School of the Northwest Conference, along with Calvert, Hopewell-Loudon, and North Baltimore of the Midland Athletic League made pitches to join the BVC after answering a letter of interest made in February 2012.  

On May 21, 2012, the BVC extended invitations to Hopewell-Loudon and North Baltimore with the following report coming from the Findlay Courier:

North Baltimore accepted the BVC's invitation on June 19, 2012, and Hopewell-Loudon did the same a day later.  Both schools joined for the 2014-15 season.

In April 2013, BVC President Traci Conley indicated the BVC wanted to expand to 14 members and first sent an invitation to Riverdale High School.  Riverdale accepted the invitation on April 22, 2013, which meant the BVC wanted to pursue a 14th member to join the league.  Riverdale's membership in the N10 was terminated shortly thereafter, and they would likely not have joined the BVC until 2015-16 at the earliest, but with Hardin Northern dropping football in 2013, Riverdale was admitted for all sports beginning in 2014.

In May 2013, Upper Scioto Valley publicly indicated that they were interested in joining the BVC as its 14th member, since they felt that its league, the Northwest Central Conference was no longer stable.  

In late 2013, the NWCC extended an invitation to Hardin Northern, which also required a response by March 1, 2014.  After suspending Hardin Northern from league play in football from 2013-2015, the BVC voted 9-1 (HN the lone dissenting vote) to refuse a guarantee that Hardin Northern would return to the league for that sport.  This pressure caused Hardin Northern's school board to decide on February 19, 2014, to withdraw from the BVC and apply to the NWCC for membership.  The NWCC accepted Hardin Northern as a full member for 2014-15 on March 19, 2014, with football joining in 2015-16.

In August 2017 Hopewell-Loudon announced that they would leave the BVC for the Sandusky Bay Conference in the 2019-2020 school year after being offered an invitation to replace Shelby.

In August 2020, Elmwood High School of the Northern Buckeye Conference announced they had received a formal invitation from the BVC and was seriously looking at the opportunity.  Following a school board meeting on February 8, 2021, multiple sources confirmed that Elmwood had unanimously approved to leave the NBC and join the BVC for the 2023-2024 school year or sooner.

At a board meeting on March 18, 2021, Cory-Rawson voted to leave the BVC for the Northwest Central Conference (NWCC) in 2023.

In August 2021, North Baltimore announced that their football team would go independent beginning with the 2022 season but remain in the BVC for the rest of their sports.  This however, would change on Nov. 2, 2021 when North Baltimore announced they would join the NWCC fully for the 2023-24 school year.

In May 2022, Liberty-Benton and the BVC announced that the Eagles would be leaving the league after the 2025-2026 school year, citing the district's student enrollment, competitive accomplishment and athletic facilities as reasons for the decision.  At the time of the announcement, Liberty-Benton did not indicate if they had another league they were invited to join or to consider for membership.

On December 16, 2022, the BVC Governing Board voted to remove Vanlue's football team from the conference beginning with the 2023-24 school year.  Vanlue intends to continue fielding an 11-man football team, but has no league affiliation yet going forward.

Enrollment 
The current enrollments of the twelve BVC schools.

Football champions

References

See also
Ohio High School Athletic Conferences

Ohio high school sports conferences